Zhang Yuhao (born 29 January 1997) is a Chinese footballer who plays as a midfielder for Spanish side Racing Rioja.

Early life
Zhang was born in Shenyang, Liaoning.

Club career
Having progressed through the Shanghai Shenhua academy, Zhang was sent on loan to both of Shanghai Shenhua's Spanish affiliate clubs Atlético Museros and CF Cracks in 2015–16. He spent time on loan with Baotou Nanjiao in 2018, playing in the China League Two. In 2019, having left Shanghai Shenhua, he joined Dalian Professional, spending two seasons with the club's reserve team.

In November 2021, Zhang signed for Spanish side Costa Brava. After a season with Costa Brava, in which he made one appearance in the Primera División RFEF, Zhang joined Racing Rioja in July 2022.

Career statistics

Club

Notes

References

1997 births
Living people
Footballers from Shenyang
Footballers from Liaoning
Chinese footballers
Association football midfielders
China League Two players
Primera Federación players
Segunda Federación players
Shanghai Shenhua F.C. players
Inner Mongolia Caoshangfei F.C. players
Dalian Professional F.C. players
UE Costa Brava players
Racing Rioja CF players
Chinese expatriate footballers
Chinese expatriate sportspeople in Spain
Expatriate footballers in Spain